CD-75 was a C Type class escort ship (Kaibōkan) of the Imperial Japanese Navy during the Second World War.

History
She was laid down by Nipponkai Zosensho K.K. at their Toyama shipyard on 5 April 1944, launched on 5 August 1944, and completed and commissioned on 21 April 1945. During the war CD-75 was mostly busy on escort duties.

On 10 August 1945, she departed from Wakkanai, Hokkaido, and soon after ran aground. She was scuttled by her crew off Nō, Niigata. Some sources indicate she may have struck a mine. On 30 November 1945, she was struck from the Navy List.

References

Additional sources

1944 ships
Ships built in Japan
Type C escort ships
Maritime incidents in August 1945
World War II shipwrecks in the Sea of Japan